Burnley College, Melbourne, Australia, is one of the oldest Colleges in the country and it specialises in horticulture.

The site of Burnley College began as the Richmond Survey Paddock in 1850. The Horticultural Society of Victoria took control in 1863 and opened the gardens on 1 January 1863, the official opening being marked by the planting of a Californian Redwood (Sequoia sempervirens) which is now a magnificent tree. 
The site was transferred to the Victorian Department of Agriculture in 1891 and the gardens became home to the new teaching college. In subsequent years, the college has taught not only production and ornamental horticulture but many areas of agriculture: Burnley has been home to a dairy herd, poultry trials and beehives.

In 1983, The college was amalgamated with the Department of Agriculture's other colleges, including Dookie College, to form the Victorian College of Agriculture and Horticulture (VCAH). As a result of the 1988 white paper on Higher Education, the VCAH was amalgamated with the University of Melbourne, formally legislated under the University of Melbourne (VCAH) act 1997. The act granted all (formerly state owned) property and assets of the VCAH to the University of Melbourne, and also transferred all obligations of the VCAH to the university.

In the mid-1990s, there were over 2000 students enrolled at the college. In 1994, 224 students graduated, 75 of whom were from the longest running course, the Advanced Diploma in Horticulture. At the time the university took control, courses ranged from introductory short courses in horticulture, through Apprentice training, TAFE courses, the Advanced Diploma, and a Bachelor of Applied Science in Horticulture. There was also a Graduate Certificate and postgraduate research at Masters and PhD levels. There were 35 academic staff, and approximately 40 technical, administration and ancillary staff.

The university phased out the TAFE courses, in line with the "Melbourne Model". Current courses run at the campus include; Doctor of Philosophy (by research), Master of Philosophy (by research), the Master of Urban Horticulture (course work), the Graduate Certificate in Arboriculture, the Graduate Certificate in Garden Design, the Specialist Certificate in Green Roofs and Walls and the associate degree in Urban Horticulture.

Burnley College is now much more focused on postgraduate research than in the past, specializing in areas such as green infrastructure, forest science, waterways ecology and management, environmental horticulture and has a significant soil science research group on campus. Facilities include a specialist library, plant nursery, field research and demonstration area, graphics studio, horticultural engineering facilities and plant tissue culture and genetics laboratories.

Today, 150 years after the Burnley Gardens were established, they continue to be a wonderful resource for students and visitors alike. The open lawns, curved paths, secluded areas and large conifers providing architectural form combine to make a classic Victorian Garden.  Recent developments such as the Native Grasslands Garden and the Rainforest Garden have provided new design themes for the gardens.

The importance of the Burnley Gardens to the State of Victoria was recognised when the gardens were added to the Victorian Heritage Register on 5 December 2003.

Australian tertiary institutions
Horticulture in Australia
Education in Melbourne
Buildings and structures in the City of Yarra
1863 establishments in Australia
Educational institutions established in 1863
Heritage sites in Melbourne
University of Melbourne